Radek Fukala (born 1963 in Karviná, Moravian-Silesian Region of the Czech Republic) is a Czech historian.

He is a Silesian, who graduated at University of Ostrava. He gained Ph.D. from Masaryk University. In 2002 he passed his habilitation at Charles University in Prague.

Works 
Role Jana Jiřího Krnovského ve stavovských hnutích., Opava 1997.
Manýrismus a globální krize 17. století?, Opava 2000.
Třicetiletá válka. Konflikt, který změnil Evropu. Opava, 2001.
Stavovská politika na Opavsku v letech 1490-1631. Opava 2004.
Sen o odplatě. Dramata třicetileté války., Praha 2005.
Jan Jiří Krnovský. Stavovské povstání a zápas s Habsburky. České Budějovice 2005.
Hohenzollernové v evropské politice 16.století. Mezi Ansbachem, Krnovem a Královcem (1523–1603)., Praha 2005.
Slezsko neznámá země Koruny české. Knížecí a stavovské Slezsko do roku 1740, České Budějovice 2007.
Poděbradové. Rod českomoravských pánů, kladských hrabat a slezských knížat, Praha 2008.

External links 
Short biography

1963 births
Living people
21st-century Czech historians
Masaryk University alumni